Jennifer Denise Carroll Foy (born September 25, 1981) is an American lawyer and politician. A member of the Democratic Party, she is a public defender by occupation. Carroll Foy was elected to represent Virginia's 2nd House of Delegates district in 2017, which covers parts of Prince William County and Stafford County in Northern Virginia. In December 2020, she resigned from the House of Delegates, in order to focus on her campaign for Governor of Virginia in 2021. She lost in the Democratic primary, placing second behind Terry McAuliffe. She is currently running for State Senate in Virginia's 33rd Senate district.

Early life and education

Jennifer Carroll Foy was born and grew up in Petersburg, Virginia. Raised by her grandmother, she graduated from Petersburg High School, where she participated in Junior Reserve Officers' Training Corps. She received her bachelor's degree from the Virginia Military Institute (VMI) in 2003. Part of the third class of female cadets to attend the university, she received a full scholarship. Carroll Foy received her master's degree from Virginia State University and a Juris Doctor degree from the Thomas Jefferson School of Law in San Diego.

Career 
After graduating from law school, Carroll Foy spent time teaching and worked in Los Angeles as a litigation associate. She moved back to Virginia and opened a private practice that focused on criminal defense.

In February 2017, Carroll Foy entered the race for the Second District seat in the Virginia House of Delegates. In her 2017 campaign, Carroll Foy ran on expanding Medicaid, raising the minimum wage, increasing teacher pay, and criminal justice reform. In November 2017, Carroll Foy beat Republican Mike Makee, and became delegate of Virginia's Second district.

In the House of Delegates, Carroll Foy sat on the Courts of Justice, Finance, and Public Safety Committees.

In 2020, Carroll Foy filed paperwork to seek the Democratic nomination in the 2021 Virginia gubernatorial election. On December 8, 2020, she announced plans to resign from the House of Delegates in order to focus full-time on her gubernatorial campaign. Her resignation came into effect on December 12, 2020. She, like fellow candidate Jennifer McClellan, would've been the first female Governor of Virginia, the second African-American governor after Douglas Wilder, and first African-American female governor of the United States if elected. However, former Governor Terry McAuliffe was renominated in the Democratic primary, instead.

Political positions

Healthcare 
Carroll Foy voted to pass Medicaid expansion in the General Assembly in March 2018, expanding health insurance coverage for 400,000 Virginians.

Women's rights
Carroll Foy proposed and passed the Equal Rights Amendment, making Virginia the 38th state to ratify the constitutional amendment.

Criminal justice 
A public defender, Carroll Foy has advocated for the reform of cash bail, criticizing what she called Virginia's "justice-for-profit system".

Carroll Foy initially abstained from voting on a 2020 proposal to reduce prison sentences, bringing Virginia's "earned sentence credit" program in line with other states. She eventually voted in favor of a significantly more conservative version of the bills.

Redistricting 
Carroll Foy supports third-party, commission-drawn legislative maps but opposed the amendment to the state constitution as proposed in 2020, saying she felt it was wrong to inscribe a “substandard” proposal in the constitution.

Labor 
Carroll Foy has been an advocate for paid family and medical leave for all workers.

Infrastructure 
Carroll Foy supports efforts to expand broadband access, particularly to southwest Virginia.

Environment and climate change 
Carroll Foy was a chief co-patron of the Virginia Clean Economy Act, which aims to shift Virginia's energy reliance to solely renewable sources over the next few decades

Personal life

She is married to Jeffrey Foy, whom she met at VMI. In July 2017, she gave birth to twin boys.

Electoral history

References

External links

Campaign website
 

1981 births
21st-century American politicians
African-American state legislators in Virginia
African-American women in politics
Candidates in the 2021 United States elections
Living people
Democratic Party members of the Virginia House of Delegates
People from Petersburg, Virginia
Thomas Jefferson School of Law people
Virginia Military Institute alumni
Virginia State University alumni
Women state legislators in Virginia
21st-century American women politicians
21st-century African-American women
21st-century African-American politicians
20th-century African-American people
20th-century African-American women
Public defenders